Khel may refer to:

 Khel (clan), a Pashtun tribal divisioning system
 KHEL-LP, a radio station licensed to serve Rogers, Arkansas, United States
 Khel (1992 film), a Hindi romantic comedy starring Madhuri Dixit and Anil Kapoor
 Khel – No Ordinary Game, a 2003 Hindi action film starring Sunny Deol, Sunil Shetty and Celina Jaitley

See also
 "Ab Khel Ke Dikha", 2016 Pakistan Super League anthem by Ali Zafar
 "Ab Khel Jamay Ga", 2017 Pakistan Super League anthem by Ali Zafar